The WSA World Tour 2013 is the international squash tour and organized circuit, organized by the Women's Squash Association (WSA) for the 2013 squash season. The most important tournament in the series is the World Open held in Penang in Malaysia in March 2014. The tour features three categories of regular events, the World Series, which features the highest prize money and the best fields, Gold and Silver tournaments.

2013 Calendar
The Women's Squash Association organises the WSA World Tour, the female equivalent of the PSA World Tour Listed below are the most important events on the tour.

World Open

World Series

Gold 50

Silver 35

Silver 25

Source

Year end world top 10 players

Retirements
Following is a list of notable players (winners of a main tour title, and/or part of the WSA World Rankings top 30 for at least one month) who announced their retirement from professional squash, became inactive, or were permanently banned from playing, during the 2013 season:

 Jaclyn Hawkes (born 3 December 1982 in the Hong Kong) joined the pro tour in 2003, reached the singles no. 12 spot in December 2012. She won 3 WSA World Tour titles. She retired in January 2013 after losing in the first round of the Carol Weymuller Open in September 2012.
 Lauren Briggs (born 8 August 1979 in the Stanford-Le-Hope) joined the pro tour in 1999, reached the singles no. 18 spot in December 2008. She won 12 WSA World Tour titles, winning in America, Finland, France, Holland, Malaysia, Switzerland, England, Scotland and Wales. She retired in November after competing a last time in the British Open.

See also
Women's Squash Association (WSA)
WSA World Series 2013
WSA World Series Finals
WSA World Open
Official Women's Squash World Ranking
PSA World Tour 2013

References

External links
 WSA website

WSA World Tour seasons
2013 in squash